Robert de Scales was appointed Knight of the Order of the Bath by Prince Edward whom he accompanied in the Scottish wars and was given an exemption for life from sitting on assizes, juries, etc. against his will. He was summoned to Parliament from 1306 until his death in 1324. He was summoned as a Peer to the Coronation of Edward II on 25 February 1308.

Residences
Robert's main residence was at Rivenhall in Essex but he also held the manors of Lyneford, Hokewold cum Wiltone, Reynham, South Lenn, Middleton, Berton Bynedick, Hoo and Ilsington in Norfolk.

Family
Robert married Egelina (aka Egelma aka Evelina) daughter of Hugh de Courtenay and they had the following children:

 Sir Robert de Scales, 3rd Baron Scales (?-1369)
 Eleanor (d. 1361), married John de Sudeley, 2nd Baron Sudeley (d. 1340)
 Petronella de Scales married Sir John de Boville

References

1324 deaths
Year of birth unknown
People knighted at the Feast of the Swans
14th-century English people
Barons Scales